Straight Girl (foaled 12 March 2009) is a Japanese Thoroughbred racehorse and broodmare. She showed modest ability in her early career, competing mainly in minor sprint races before winning the Listed Owari Stakes on her final run as a four-year-old in 2013. In the following year she won the Grade 3 Silk Road Stakes and was placed in the Takamatsunomiya Kinen, Victoria Mile, Sprinters Stakes and Hong Kong Sprint. She appeared to reach her peak as a six-year-old in 2015 when she won both the Victoria Mile and the Sprinters Stakes. The mare was kept in training for two races a seven-year-old and produced arguably her best performance on her final appearance when she won the Victoria Mile for a second time.

Background
Straight Girl is a bay mare with a large white star, a partial white blaze on the lower part of her face and muzzle and white socks on her hind legs. She was bred at the Okamoto Ranch by her owner, Toshihiro Hirosaki's TH Co Ltd. During her racing career she was trained by Toshihiro Hirosaki.

Her sire Fuji Kiseki became the first major winner sired by Sunday Silence when he won the Asahi Hai Futurity Stakes in 1994. As a breeding stallion his other progeny included Kane Hekili, Sun Classique (Dubai Sheema Classic) and Isla Bonita (Satsuki Shō). Straight Girl's dam Never Period showed some racing ability, winning three of her twelve starts. She was descended from the imported British mare Lavatera, who was in turn a descendant of the influential broodmare Friar's Daughter.

Racing career

2011 & 2012: two and three-year-old seasons
Straight Girl began her racing career with four races at Sapporo Racecourse in the late summer and autumn of 2011. After finishing unplaced on her debut on 21 August she recorded her first success in a maiden race over 1200 metres six days later. She was beaten in her next two races before moving to Hanshin Racecourse where she finished seventh in a minor event on 10 December.

In 2012 Straight Girl finished unplaced in two starts at Kyoto Racecourse early in the year and then returned from a four-month break to win a minor event over 1200 metres at Hakodate Racecourse in June. She was beaten in her next two races before running second in a minor race at Sapporo on 1 September in what proved to be her final run of the year.

2013: four-year-old season
After being off the track for nine months Straight Girl returned to the track and finished second to Yulefest in a minor race at Hakodate on 16 June. She then began to make rapid progress and won four races in succession, all over 1200 metres at Hakodate: she won a minor race on 23 June, the Sponichi Sho on 13 July, the Nikkan Spots Hai on 20 July and the UHB Sho on 11 August. She was then moved up in class for the Grade 3 Kenneland Cup on 25 August but was narrowly beaten into second place by the five-year-old mare Forever Mark. On her final run of the year she recorded her first major success when he won the Listed Owari Stakes over 1200 metres at Chukyo Racecourse on 8 December.

2014: five-year-old season

In 2014 Straight Girl was ridden in all of her races by Yasunari Iwata. She began her campaign in the Grade 3 Silk Road Stakes on 2 February at Kyoto in which started at odds of 4.2/1 and won by two and a half lengths from the favourite Lady of Opera. She failed to win again that year but established herself as a high class performer as she put up several excellent efforts in defeat. In March she was stepped up to Grade 1 level for the first time for the Takamatsunomiya Kinen over 1200 metres at Chukyo and finished third of the eighteen runners behind Copano Richard and Snow Dragon. Having spent most of her career running in sprint races the mare was moved up in distance for the Victoria Mile at Tokyo Racecourse in May. In a closely contested finish she came home third behind Verxina and Meisho Mambo beaten just over half a length by the winner. In June she was dropped in class and started odds-on favourite for the Grade 3 Hakodate but produced her only poor run of the season as she finished eighth.

After the summer break, Straight Girl returned in the Sprinters Stakes run that year at Niigata Racecourse on 5 October. She came home second to the 46/1 outsider Snow Dragon in a "blanket finish" which saw sixteen horses covered by less than four and a half lengths. On her final run of the year the mare was matched against international competition in the Hong Kong Sprint at Sha Tin Racecourse in December. Starting at odds of 16/1 she produced a strong late run to take third place behind the locally trained geldings Aerovelocity and Peniaphobia. The horses finishing behind included Gordon Lord Byron, Buffering, Sole Power, Snow Dragon and Lucky Nine.

2015: six-year-old season

On her 2015 debut Straight Girl started favourite for her second attempt at the Takamatsunomiya Kinen on 29 March but finished unplaced behind Aerovelocity. After this race Keita Tosaki took over as the mare's regular jockey and rode her in all of her remaining races. As in 2016 the mare then stepped up in trip to tackle the Victoria Mile and started at odds of 13.1/1 in a field of eighteen fillies and mares at Tokyo on 17 May. The 2014 Yushun Himba winner Nuovo Record started favourite while the other runners included Shonan Pandora, Meisho Mambo and Red Reveur (Hanshin Juvenile Fillies). Straight Girl was settled in fifth place as the 290/1 outsider Minaret set the pace from her fellow long-shot Kaiei Elegant. In the straight she made a sustained run on the outside, overtook the two outsiders in the final strides and won by a neck and one and three quarter lengths from Kaiei Elegant and Minaret. After the race Kosaki said "She broke really well today. I thought that the pace would be somewhat fast and that she will stretch well if I can save her energy until the right moment. The frontrunners were holding off well in the straight but the mare showed a magnificent turn of foot. I rode her for the first time today but she was easy to ride and ran a strong race".

After a summer break Straight Girl returned in the Grade 2 Centaur Stakes over 1200 metres at Hanshin in September in which she finished fourth behind Active Minoru, Uliuli and Barbara, beaten less than half a length by the winner. The Sprinters Stakes returned to its usual venue at Nakayama on 4 October 2015 and Straight Girl was made the 3.4/1 favourite. Her fourteen opponents included Active Minoru, Uliuli, Copano Richard, Hakusan Moon (2014 Centaur Stakes), Mikki Isle (NHK Mile Cup), and Rich Tapestry (Santa Anita Sprint Championship). Straight Girl tracked the leaders before launching a strong run in the last 200 metres and won by three quarters of a length from Sakura Gospel. Following the race Hideaki Fujiwara commented "I owe it to the owner who has been so understanding as to let me keep her in training towards this long-awaited goal, and the stable staff that had put in every effort to make this happen. She's such a special mare to be able to keep turning in such consistent results throughout her career and to win a sprint G1 at six years old", before suggesting that the mare would be retired from at the end of the year. In December the mare made her second attempt to win the Hong Kong Sprint but was unable to reproduce her performance of 2014 and finished ninth behind Peniaphobia.

2016: seven-year-old season
Despite expectations that she would be retired to become a broodmare, Straight Girl returned to the track in 2016. She made little impact on her seasonal debut as she finished ninth behind Smart Layer in the Grade 2 Hanshin Himba Stakes over 1600 metres on 9 April. Five weeks after her run at Hanshin, the seven-year-old mare attempted to win a second Victoria Mile and started a 16.7/1 outsider. Mikki Queen (Yusun Himba, Shuka Sho) started favourite in an eighteen-runner field which also included Shonan Pandora, Meisho Mambo, Uliuli, Red Reveur, Let's Go Donki (Oka Sho), Shonan Adela (Hanshin Juvenile Fillies), Smart Layer, Rouge Buck and Queens Ring. Tosaki settled the mare in fourth place before moving up on the inside to take the lead soon after the final turn. Straight Girl broke clear of her rivals in the closing stages and came home two and a half lengths in front of Mikki Queen, with Shonan Pandora a nose away in third place. The winning time of 1:31.5 was a new record for the race. Tosaki commented "Her response was terrific and we were very fortunate to find a clear path open right in front of us in the homestretch. I felt I didn’t have to use my whip, but with top G1 competition chasing us, I drove her to the finish line just in case".

Assessment and awards
In the JRA Awards for 2015 Straight Girl finished second behind Shonan Pandora in the voting for the JRA Award for Best Older Filly or Mare and second to Maurice in the poll to determine the JRA Award for Best Sprinter or Miler. In the following year she finished third to Marialite in the Best Older Filly or Mare category.

Breeding record
Straight Girl did not race after her second win in the Victoria Mile and was retired at the end of the season to become a broodmare. Her first foal, a colt sired by Frankel was born in 2018.

Pedigree

References

2009 racehorse births
Racehorses bred in Japan
Racehorses trained in Japan
Thoroughbred family 16-a